Tillandsia ixioides is a species in the genus Tillandsia. It is native to South America. Two subspecies are recognized:

Tillandsia ixioides subsp. ixioides - Bolivia, Uruguay, Paraguay, northern Argentina
Tillandsia ixioides subsp. viridiflora (Rauh) Gouda - Bolivia

Cultivars 
 Tillandsia 'Auravale'
 Tillandsia 'Do-Ra-Me'
 Tillandsia 'Kybong'
 Tillandsia 'Mystic Flame'
 Tillandsia 'Mystic Flame Orange'
 Tillandsia 'Peach Parfait'
 Tillandsia 'Poor Ixy'
 Tillandsia 'Tandur'
 Tillandsia 'White Star'

References 

ixioides
Flora of South America
Plants described in 1879